L'Enfant (English: The Child) is a 2005 Belgian film directed by Jean-Pierre and Luc Dardenne, starring Jérémie Renier and Déborah François. The film was released under its French title in the US, and as The Child in the UK.

It received critical acclaim and won the Palme d'Or at the 2005 Cannes Film Festival, among other accolades. In 2017, the film was named the fourteenth "Best Film of the 21st Century So Far" by The New York Times.

Plot
Bruno, 20, and Sonia, 18, are surviving on her welfare cheques and Bruno's petty crimes when Sonia becomes pregnant. While Sonia is absent, Bruno sells their baby to a black market adoption ring to make some quick cash. He tells Sonia, telling her that they can simply "make" another baby, but Sonia is sickened and faints.

Faced with Sonia's shock, and feeling regret for his mistake, Bruno buys the child back at a premium—but, after being turned away by Sonia, his mounting debts lead Bruno down a quick path to desperation. He also learns Sonia is pressing charges. He winds up in prison, and Sonia visits him, sharing a moment of despair.

Cast
Jérémie Renier as Bruno
Déborah François as Sonia
Jérémie Segard as Steve
Fabrizio Rongione 
Olivier Gourmet

Reception

Critical response
L'Enfant received mostly positive reviews from critics. Review aggregation website Rotten Tomatoes gives it an 86% approval rating, based on 106 reviews, with an average score of 7.5/10. The site's consensus reads, "The Dardennes continue to excel at presenting works of rigorous naturalism, with detached observations of authentic characters that nevertheless resonate with complex moral issues.". On Metacritic, which assigns a normalized rating out of 100 to reviews from mainstream critics, the film received an average score of 87, based on 34 reviews, indicating "universal acclaim".

Accolades
L'Enfant won the Palme d'Or in 2005 Cannes Film Festival, making directors Jean-Pierre Dardenne and Luc Dardenne twice winners of the Palme d'Or, having won the award previously in 1999 with Rosetta.  The film received the André Cavens Award for Best Film by the Belgian Film Critics Association (UCC). It was also nominated for Best Film and Best Actor (for Jérémie Renier) at the European Film Awards.

The film was chosen as Belgium's official entry for the Academy Award for Best Foreign Language Film at the 78th Academy Awards,  but did not secure a nomination.

See also
List of Belgian submissions for Academy Award for Best Foreign Language Film

References

External links

2005 drama films
Palme d'Or winners
Films set in Belgium
Belgium in fiction
Films directed by the Dardenne brothers
Sony Pictures Classics films
Films about atonement
Best French-Language Film Lumières Award winners
Best Foreign Film Guldbagge Award winners
Belgian drama films
2000s French-language films